Images of Liberation is a 1982 Danish drama film directed by Lars von Trier in his directorial debut.

The film was Trier's graduation film from the National Film School of Denmark. It became the first ever Danish school film to receive regular theatrical distribution. It was screened in the Panorama section of the 34th Berlin International Film Festival.

Plot
The story is set in Copenhagen during World War II, and follows a German officer who visits his Danish mistress the days after the occupation of Denmark has ended.

Cast
 Edward Fleming as Leo Mendel
 Kirsten Olesen as Esther

References

External links
 

1982 films
Danish World War II films
1980s Danish-language films
Films directed by Lars von Trier
Films set in Copenhagen
Student films